Anisotoma is a genus of flowering plants formerly belonging to the plant family Asclepiadaceae, now considered to be part of the Apocynaceae, first described as a genus in 1844. They are native to South Africa

Species
 Anisotoma cordifolia Fenzl - South Africa
 Anisotoma pedunculata N.E.Br. - KwaZulu-Natal
 
formerly included, transferred to Brachystelma
Anisotoma arnottii (Baker) Benth. & Hook.f. ex B.D.Jacks. synonym of  Brachystelma arnottii Baker

References

Apocynaceae genera
Endemic flora of South Africa
Asclepiadoideae
Taxa named by Eduard Fenzl